Andreas Nygaard (born 7 November 1878 – 5 September 1963) was a Norwegian politician.

He was born in Kongsberg to Silver Works employee Ole Hansen Nygaard and Johanne Popperud. He was assigned with the Kongsberg Våpenfabrikk from 1894, from 1921 as supervisor. He was elected representative to the Storting for the periods 1928–1930, 1934–1936 and 1937–1945, for the Labour Party. From 1931–1933 he served as the deputy representative for Torgeir Olavson Vraa.

References

1878 births
1963 deaths
People from Kongsberg
Labour Party (Norway) politicians
Members of the Storting